The Big Gun, at  high, is the ninth-highest peak in Ireland on the Arderin list, or the tenth-highest according to the Vandeleur-Lynam list. It is part of the MacGillycuddy's Reeks in County Kerry, and is also known as Lackagarrin or Foilnabreachaun.

Geography 

The Big Gun is in the eastern section of the MacGillycuddy's Reeks in County Kerry, Ireland's highest mountain range.  It is on a narrow rocky arête between the mountains of Cnoc na Péiste  to the southwest, and Cruach Mhór  to the north, and is considered as offering some of the most exposed and serious hill walking in Ireland (equivalent to The Bones on the nearby Beenkeragh Ridge).

Because of its positioning, The Big Gun is usually climbed as part of a horseshoe, or loop-walk, of the eastern section of the Reeks, starting and ending from the Hag's Glen. It is also climbed as part of the even longer MacGillycuddy's Reeks Ridge Walk, which often starts at The Big Gun's eastern end, from Kate Kearney's Cottage in the Gap of Dunloe.

The Big Gun is the 378th-highest mountain peak in Britain and Ireland on the Simm classification. It is regarded by the Scottish Mountaineering Club ("SMC") as one of 34 Furths, which is a mountain peak above  in elevation, and meets the other SMC criteria for a Munro (e.g. "sufficient separation"), but which is outside of (or furth) Scotland; which is why The Big Gun is sometimes referred to as one of the 13 Irish Munros.

The Big Gun's prominence qualifies it to meet the Arderin classification, and the British Isles Simm and Hewitt classifications.

See also 

 Lists of mountains in Ireland
 List of mountains of the British Isles by height
 List of Furth mountains in the British Isles

References

External links
MountainViews: The Irish Mountain Website
MountainViews: Irish Online Mountain Database
The Database of British and Irish Hills , the largest database of British Isles mountains ("DoBIH")
Hill Bagging UK & Ireland, the searchable interface for the DoBIH
Ordnance Survey Ireland ("OSI") Online Map Viewer
Logainm: Placenames Database of Ireland

Mountains and hills of County Kerry
Furths
Mountains under 1000 metres